Luzech ( or ; Languedocien: Lusèg) is a commune in the Lot department in south-western France.

Geography
Luzech is a small town of around 1,750 inhabitants, located in  Quercy at the heart of the vineyard of Cahors wine making region (AOC) on the ancient line Monsempron – Libos – Cahors between Fumel and Cahors. 
Encircled by the river Lot, Luzech is a peninsula, an inescapable stage on the circuit "Empowered by the Lot". A dam, the Barrage de Luzech was constructed in the late 1940s. Animated by very active associations, the town offers many socio-cultural and sporting activities, such as orienteering, fishing and kayaking.
Luzech is situated on an isthmus formed by the Lot, 90 m wide (or 300 Roman feet), bordered to the north by the hill of the Impernal (150 m) and to the south by that of the Pistoule (70 m), so that the river bypasses a loop, called "cingle" (meander). The central square (main street) is built on the site of an old canal, created for navigation in 1840, and filled in between 1940 and 1950. It shortened the navigation on the Lot by around 5 km. As part of the navigation project of the Lot as far as Aiguillon, there is currently an impassable barrier at Luzech, but projects are underway to advance it.

Place Names
The place name Luzech could be based on Gallic names such as Lucetios, Luteus or Lutos followed by -ecia 1.

History
Luzech was already inhabited in prehistoric times, including the Pech de la Nène. Before the Roman conquest, the Gauls built an oppidum on the Impernal, naturally fortified by its rugged character.

Luzech was among the places in the Lot considered to possibly be the famous fortified camp of Uxellodunum. The hypothesis was defended once upon a time by Napoleon III, who finally determined the location of Puy Issolud was still defended, with some notoriety by a local scholar, Emile Albouy in 1957. However, recent excavations of the Fountain Loulié in Puy Issolud led to a scientific consensus on the issue, even if individuals still defended sites other than that of Puy d’Issolud. For this reason the visitors will use Uxellodunum street to go to the administration building and will park in the Square of Lucterius who was the heroic leader of this resistance, and whose majestic bust is located at the entrance to the Cahors library.

In the Middle Ages, the walls hemmed the town in on all sides. They were built at the foot of the castle, the oldest mention of which goes back to the same century. Several gates gave access to the town, crossed from north to south by the Main street from the Ruffier gate to the Ditch gate.

Luzech was home to one of the four baronies of Quercy. It was called the town of the barons to mark the importance of the family of De Luzech, who preserved it from the eleventh century to the early seventeenth century when it then passed onto the house of Rastignac who occupied it up the Revolution.

Taken by Richard the Lion Heart in 1188, Luzech later fell into the hands of Albigensians, but during the crusade of the early thirteenth century, the fortress was taken and burned by the Crusaders of Simon de Montfort. It was acquired later by Guillaume de Cardaillac, Bishop of Cahors, who became lord of Luzech. The barons became co-lords.

The Hundred Years' War caused havoc: most castles fell to the English, but they never considered implementing their plan to besiege Luzech.

Excavations on the hill of the Impernal helped expose remains of walls and buildings of Gallic and Roman times.

The Chapt de Rastignac family from Limousin, inherited in Quercy, property of the barons of Luzech in 1600, thanks to the marriage of Jacquette Ricard Gourdon, widow of John II of Luzech, with Jean Chapt Rastignac. This one, attached to the service of Louis XIII and then Louis XIV, avoided the village of Luzech  and the uncertainties of the Fronde. In 1617, the estate of Rastignac was elevated to the status of the marquisat, and John became a brigadier. In a letter addressed to him, Louis XIII wrote: "(...) I have you always under the consideration that you deserve. I pray God, Count, to have you in His Holy Guard" They possessed Luzech until the mid-eighteenth century. Their descendant, Alfred de la Rochefoucauld, whose mother was born Zénaïde Rastignac, would sell all the family property, and yield to the town all that was left of the castle of the Barons.

Héraldique 

 Its blazon is: Écu quartered: 
first and fourth silver, with Azure Griffin, 
the second and third with Silver Crescent.

Political trends and results 

Related article : Élections municipales de 2014 dans le Lot.

List of the Mayors 
 March 2001 | 2014     | Jean-Claude Baldy| PRG  |
 March 1989 | 2001 | Henri Castagnède | PRG  | Conseiller général

Demography 
In 2017, the municipality had 1,815 inhabitants.

Economy 
The river port of Luzech is managed by the Chamber of Commerce and Industry of the Lot.

Sites and monuments 
 

 Château de Caïx
 Château dof Luzech or Tour of Luzech. Tour de l'ancien château de Luzech was classified as an ancient monument on 18 February 1905, note 6.
 Uxellodunum
 Chapelle de Notre-Dame-de-l'Île : la chapelle de Notre-Dame de l'île  3 km to the south, dated 1504. elle est due à l'évêque Antoine de Luzech, elle abrite une vierge à l'Enfant du xve siècle. L'édifice est inscrit au titre des monuments historiques en 1929, note 7.
 Chapelle Saint-Jacques de Luzech ou des Pénitents Bleus 
 la chapelle gothique des pénitents bleus construite en briques, elle se distingue des autres monuments de culte de la région. La chapelle est inscrite au titre des monuments historiques en 1995, note 8.
 L'église Saint-Pierre des xive et xve siècles se compose d'une nef de trois travées, flanquée de bas-côtés, et d’un chevet plat ajouré d'une baie à remplage. Le clocher-tour carré, massif, s'élève au-dessus du chœur.
 Église Saint-Martin-de-Caïx de Luzech : l'église de Caïx à 2 km au nord de Luzech, en direction de Caillac est inscrite au titre des monuments historiques en 1993, note 9.
 L'église Notre-Dame de Camy 3 km west of Luzech, in the direction of Castelfranc est inscrite au titre des monuments historiques en 1976, note 10.
 L'église de Fages à 3 km à l'ouest de Luzech, sur le plateau
 Monument aux morts signé Henri Bouchard
 Maison des Consuls est inscrite au titre des monuments historiques en 1974, note 11.
 Oppidum de Luzech : Oppidum classé monument historique en 1984, note 12.

Education

The  Scholarly City 

In 2014, the site of the Scholarly City was begun. This will bring together the nursery, primary and secondary schools. Funding is provided by the Department of the Lot, and by the town of Luzech for a total amount of €16.4 million, including €12 million for the College. 
The first stone was laid on 19 December 2014 by Serge Rigal (Chairman of the Department), Gérard Alazard (Mayor of Luzech) and three children: one for kindergarten, one for primary and one for college.
The school will accommodate 450 students with the possibility of extending it to 500, a primary school size 150 and kindergarten size 90 on 6000 m2. Thirty companies of which a third are from the department  of the Lot, participated in the construction. The Scholarly City was officially inaugurated by François Hollande, President of the Republic, in April 2017.

The  Impernal College 

The college of the Imperial of Luzech is located on the left bank of Lot, 150 meters south of the east-west route D8. For the 2014-2015 school year, 292 students were enrolled and divided into twelve classes, on four levels, from sixth to third. 51 students are part of the rugby Sports Section.

Primary school 

The public primary school has 69 students divided into 3 classes of 16 students each.

Nursery school 

The public kindergarten hosted 71 children, divided into three classes, in 2012.

Sport

The rugby club XV, the Sports Union of Luzech, evolved into the Championship of France, 3rd Federal division, for the 2010-2011 season. It was relegated for the 2011-2012 season. In 2013-2014, it was promoted again to a higher grade.

Personalities linked to the commune 

 Margrethe II of Denmark
 Henri de Laborde de Monpezat, prince of Denmark
 Bernadette Ségol, Secretary General of the European Confederation of the  unions, is a native of Luzech.

References 

 Gaston Bazalgues, À la découverte des noms de lieux du Quercy : Toponymie lotoise, Gourdon, Éditions de la Bouriane et du Quercy, juin 2002, 127 p., p. 116.
 "Uxellodunum : ville principale des Cadurques dans la Gaule celtique, qui, plus que toute autre, incarna l'honneur national des Gaulois et dont la reddition mit le point final à la conquête romaine. On n'arrive pas à se mettre d'accord sur sa localisation : Puy d'Issolud, Luzech, Capdenac, Murcens ? Un érudit local, Émile Albouy, entreprit, il y a quelques années (en 1957) de trancher ce problème particulièrement controversé. Il se prononce en faveur de Luzech. Sa démonstration parait assez convaincante" Annexe à la traduction de "la Guerre des Gaules" de César, La Pléiade, page 1080
 Des villages de Cassini aux communes d'aujourd'hui [archive] sur le site de l'École des hautes études en sciences sociales.
 Fiches Insee - Populations légales de la commune pour les années 2005 [archive], 2008 [archive], 2010 [archive], 2013 [archive].
 Le Lot partie Chemins de fer p. 202 - Armand Viré - Réédition de l'ouvrage de 1907 - 
 "Château de Luzech" [archive], base Mérimée, ministère français de la Culture
 "Chapelle de Notre-Dame-de-l'Île" [archive], base Mérimée, ministère français de la Culture.
 "Chapelle des Pénitents Bleus" [archive], base Mérimée, ministère français de la Culture.
 « Église Saint-Martin-de-Caïx » [archive], base Mérimée, ministère français de la Culture.
 « Église Notre-Dame de Camy » [archive], base Mérimée, ministère français de la Culture.
 « Maison des Consuls » [archive], base Mérimée, ministère français de la Culture.
 « Oppidum de Luzech » [archive], base Mérimée, ministère français de la Culture.
 « Le chantier de la Cité scolaire de Luzech en images » [archive], sur http://lot.fr [archive], 31 octobre 2014 (consulté le 1er février 2015).

External links

 

Communes of Lot (department)